These are the results of the mixed doubles competition in badminton at the 2011 Southeast Asian Games in Jakarta.

Medal winners

Draw

References 
Results

Badminton at the 2011 Southeast Asian Games